Neil Stephen Cicierega (born August 23, 1986) is an American comedian, actor, filmmaker, singer, YouTuber, musician, songwriter, puppeteer, artist, and animator. He is known as the creator of a genre of Flash animation he termed "Animutation", the Harry Potter puppet parody series Potter Puppet Pals, and several music albums under the name Lemon Demon. He also released a series of mashup albums under his own name that have since gained a cult following.

Early life
Neil Stephen Cicierega was born in Boston, Massachusetts, on August 23, 1986. His father was a programmer, which meant he was surrounded by computers while growing up. He has a brother and two sisters. His sister, Emmy, went on to become a storyboard artist for animated series such as Gravity Falls, The Owl House, and the reboot of DuckTales. At a young age, Cicierega started using a simplistic game developing program named Klik & Play. Beginning in the fourth grade, his parents homeschooled him and his siblings. He continued making amateur games, and began creating digital music to feature in them; he soon shared his music online through MP3.com under the name Trapezoid, which was later renamed to the anagram "Deporitaz" at the behest of another band already named Trapezoid. He also began composing MIDI music fragments that were referenced in his later works.

Career

Animutation

Cicierega was first known for a series of dadaist or surrealist Flash animations he termed "Animutation". Animutations feature arbitrary, nonsensical scenes and pop culture imagery and are typically set to novelty or foreign music, often from the Japanese version of Pokémon.

Potter Puppet Pals

Cicierega's Potter Puppet Pals is a comedy series which parodies the book series Harry Potter. It originated as a pair of Flash animations on Newgrounds in 2003, and later resurfaced in the form of a series of live action puppet shows released onto YouTube and PotterPuppetPals.com, starting in 2006. The central characters of the Harry Potter series are portrayed simply by puppets. The most successful Potter Puppet Pals video, The Mysterious Ticking Noise, currently has over 200 million views. Cicierega has done puppetry live at Harry Potter-themed events.

Lemon Demon (2003–present)

Since 2003, Cicierega has released 10 full-length albums under his musical project Lemon Demon. In 2005, he and animator Shawn Vulliez released a Flash animated music video "The Ultimate Showdown of Ultimate Destiny" on Newgrounds. The song was later included in the 2006 album Dinosaurchestra. An updated recording of the song was released to the Rock Band Network in 2010.

In April 2009, Cicierega released his first four albums as free downloads on his site "neilcic.com"; however, they are now currently hosted on "lemondemon.com".

In January 2016, Cicierega announced Spirit Phone, a full-length Lemon Demon album released on February 29, 2016. On July 10, 2018, it was announced that copies of the album on CD, cassette tape and vinyl would be sold through Needlejuice Records, who would later distribute remastered versions of Lemon Demon's Christmas EP I Am Become Christmas, as well as Nature Tapes, View-Monster and Dinosaurchestra.

The Mouth mashup albums (2014–present)

Cicierega has also created mashup music under his own name. He released two mashup albums, Mouth Sounds and Mouth Silence, as free downloads in 2014, and a third, Mouth Moods, in 2017. A fourth album, Mouth Dreams, was released on September 30, 2020. All four albums are linked by their usage of Smash Mouth's "All Star", which is repeated frequently throughout Sounds and Moods, and appears through Easter eggs and references in Silence. In Mouth Dreams, "All Star" only makes one appearance in the track "Mouth Dreams (Extro)", where a heavily distorted edit of the lyrics can be heard.

Windows 95 Tips, Tricks, and Tweaks (2012–2015)
In October 2012, Cicierega created the darkly satirical "Windows 95 Tips, Tricks, and Tweaks" blog, located at windows95tips.com. In the blog's telling, Windows 95 is a brooding, evil presence bent on dominating humanity. Most of the posts are faked error messages, with messages like "Windows needs a lock of your hair to continue," but presented in the exact graphical style of Windows 95. The blog has received favorable press attention.

Video games
On October 3, 2002, Cicierega launched his first point-and-click adventure game, Satan Quest. On February 26, 2015, he announced another game, Icon Architect 1.0, with themes similar to his "Windows 95 Tips, Tricks, and Tweaks" blog. On February 5, 2018, he released Monster Breeder.

Other works
In February 2019, Cicierega created Endless Jeopardy, a Twitter account that automatically posts a bot-generated Jeopardy! prompt every hour and awards points to the most-liked responses within 15 minutes. In March 2019, he created "Bot Pops" (@BotPops), a Twitter account that writes setups for jokes on popsicle sticks, then finishes them with a punchline from the replies. In April 2019 he created "4:3" (@FullscreenDream), a Twitter account that randomly makes GIFs from old commercials and CGI shorts.

Cicierega was commissioned to make three songs for the TV series Gravity Falls: a theme song, a musical number for Bill Cipher titled "It's Gonna Get Weird", and the song "Goat and a Pig" (a parody of Natalie Cole's "This Will Be"). Both of Cicierega's theme songs and "It's Gonna Get Weird" were unused, but "Goat and Pig" appeared during the credits sequence of season 2 episode "The Love God". One of the two unused openings appeared as a bonus track on the 2016 Lemon Demon album Spirit Phone, titled "Gravitron".

Personal life
On August 8, 2015, Cicierega married illustrator and comic artist Ming Doyle, with whom he lives in Somerville, Massachusetts. Their first child, a daughter named Darcy, was born in March 2018.

Discography

As Deporitaz
Outsmart (2000)
Microwave This CD (2001) 
Dimes (2002)
Circa 2000 (2007)

Trapezoid
OC ReMix: Monkey Island 2: LeChuck's Revenge "Monkey Brain Soup for the Soul" (2002)
The Count Censored (2007)

Lemon Demon
Clown Circus (2003)
Live From The Haunted Candle Shop (2003)
Hip to the Javabean (2004)
Damn Skippy (2005)
Dinosaurchestra (2006)
View-Monster (2008)
Almanac 2009 (2009) 
Live (Only Not) (2011)
I Am Become Christmas EP (2012) 
Nature Tapes EP (2014)
Spirit Phone (2016)

Neil Cicierega
Mouth Sounds (2014)
Mouth Silence (2014)
Mouth Moods (2017)
Not For Resale: A Video Game Store Documentary OST (2020)
Mouth Dreams (2020)

References

External links

Official YouTube channel
Old archived EvilTrailMix website
Mouth Sounds, Mouth Silence, Mouth Moods and Mouth Dreams, each on Internet Archive

1986 births
American alternative rock musicians
American amateur film directors
American animated film directors
American Internet celebrities
American puppeteers
Computer animation people
Flash artists
Living people
American mashup artists
Music YouTubers
People from Somerville, Massachusetts
Keytarists
Film directors from Massachusetts
Remixers
21st-century American musicians